Excélsior is a daily newspaper in Mexico City. It is the second oldest paper in the city after El Universal, printing its first issue on March 18, 1917.

History
Originating from the weekly journal Revista de revistas, Excélsior was founded by Rafael Alducin and first published in Mexico City on March 18, 1917. In 1924, Alducin died at the age of 35, and his family led the newspaper into difficult times. Ultimately, it was reconstituted as a worker-owned cooperative in 1932, with one-time accountant Gilberto Figueroa named general manager. His ability to manage finances and broker compromise within the newspaper contributed to a successful 30-year reign, in which the newspaper would become politically and economically stable.

Beginning in 1968, the newspaper's editorial stance was of a relatively liberal bent, under the editorship of Julio Scherer García. After Scherer left the newspaper in 1976, the editorial stance became more overtly supportive of the Institutional Revolutionary Party (PRI) and the Mexican establishment in general, in a move spurred when President Luis Echeverría secretly incited a group of workers to take over the cooperative and install new leadership. The "Excélsior coup" instituted the new leadership that would be at the head of Excélsior until 2001. The outgoing editorial staff went on to found new publications, like Proceso, Vuelta and Unomásuno.

In 2001, Regino Díaz Redondo, who had led the paper since 1976, was ousted, leaving in his wake a disorganized cooperative and an indebted newspaper. The end of the PRI's hold on Mexican politics brought with it a falling out of favor for the publication.

In January 2006, the newspaper was sold to Grupo Imagen, the owners of radio and TV interests in Mexico City, headed by Olegario Vázquez Raña. The cooperative voted 591–7 to authorize the sale of Excélsior. The sale led to the dissolution of the cooperative and the relaunch of the newspaper on March 18, 2006. The publication of its weekly journal Revista de revistas ended. Its main writers also contribute to Imagen radio and Cadena Tres; Excélsior TV, a cable news channel also available over the air in Mexico City, launched in September 2013.

See also
 Communications in Mexico
 List of newspapers in Mexico

References

Further reading
 Brewster, Claire. "The Student Movement of 1968 and the Mexican Press: The Cases of "Excélsior" and "Siempre"!" Bulletin of Latin American Research 21, no. 2 (2002): 171–90.

External links 
 
 Excélsior at the Mondo Times
 English translations of Excélsior articles available at nonprofit WorldMeets.US

Newspapers published in Mexico City
Publications established in 1917
Spanish-language websites
Grupo Imagen
1917 establishments in Mexico